Gregg House may refer to:

Gregg House (Fayetteville, Arkansas), listed on the National Register of Historic Places in Washington County
Gregg House (Newport, Arkansas), listed on the National Register of Historic Places in Jackson County, Arkansas
Edward M. Gregg Farm, Jerome, Idaho, listed on the National Register of Historic Places in Jerome County
William L. Gregg House, Westmont, Illinois, listed on the NRHP in DuPage County, Illinois
Sturgeon-Gregg House, Simpsonville, Kentucky, listed on the National Register of Historic Places in Shelby County, Kentucky
Gregg-Moses House, Kalispell, Montana, listed on the National Register of Historic Places in Flathead County, Montana
Gregg House (Wellington, Ohio), listed on the National Register of Historic Places in Lorain County, Ohio
Andrew Gregg Homestead, Centre Hall, Pennsylvania, listed on the National Register of Historic Places in Centre County
Joseph Gregg House, Kennett Square, Pennsylvania, listed on the National Register of Historic Places in Centre County
Gregg House (Chatham University), Pennsylvania
Gregg-Wallace Farm Tenant House, Mars Bluff, South Carolina, listed on the National Register of Historic Places in Florence County, South Carolina
Slave Houses, Gregg Plantation, Mars Bluff, South Carolina, listed on the National Register of Historic Places in Florence County, South Carolina
Boyce-Gregg House, Memphis, Tennessee, listed on the National Register of Historic Places in Shelby County, Tennessee